The 2007 Men's African Volleyball Championship was in South Africa, with 9 teams participating in the continental championship .

Teams

Preliminary round

Group A

Group B

Final round

Final ranking

1. 

2. 

3. 

4. 

2007 Men
African championship, Men
Men's African Volleyball Championship
2007 in South African sport
International volleyball competitions hosted by South Africa